Wan'an Township is a township under the administration of Pucheng County, Fujian, China. , it has 10 villages under its administration.

References 

Township-level divisions of Fujian
Pucheng County, Fujian